The Wayne and The Waldorf Apartments are two historic apartment buildings located in downtown Buffalo, Erie County, New York. They were built about 1897, and are twin four-story, three bay, painted brick buildings with modest Colonial Revival style detailing. Each building houses four apartment suites, or “flats” per floor for a total of 16 apartment units.  The buildings are situated along Waldorf Place, a small private lane running between the two. The buildings have been renovated.

It was listed on the National Register of Historic Places in 2014.

References

External links
Buffalo Rising: Preliminary Restoration Work Begins at 1106-1110 Main

Residential buildings on the National Register of Historic Places in New York (state)
Colonial Revival architecture in New York (state)
Residential buildings completed in 1897
Buildings and structures in Buffalo, New York
National Register of Historic Places in Buffalo, New York